HNLMS Zwaardvisch (S814) was the lead ship of the Royal Netherlands Navy's , which was based on the British T class. The submarine was originally ordered as HMS Talent (P322) and built by Vickers Armstrong, Barrow. It served mainly in the Pacific against the Japanese during the war, operating under both British and US operational command in Ceylon and Australia. In 1950, the vessel was renamed HNLMS Zwaardvis. She was sold and broken up for scrap in 1963.

Design and description
She displaced 1,290 tons surfaced and 1,560 tons submerged. Powered by twin  diesel engines, and twin  electric motors, the submarine was capable of achieving  while surfaced and  submerged. She had a complement of 61 personnel and was armed with six internal forward-facing 21 inch (533 mm) torpedo tubes, two external forward-facing torpedo tubes, two external amidships rear-facing torpedo tubes, one external rear-facing torpedo tubes, six reload torpedoes, a single QF 4 inch (100 mm) deck gun and three anti-aircraft machine guns.

Operational history
The submarine was laid down on 13 October 1942 and built by Vickers Armstrong, of Barrow. She was launched on 17 July 1943 as HMS Talent, but was not commissioned into the Royal Navy, instead being transferred to the Royal Netherlands Navy on 23 March 1943, and commissioned into service on 23 November 1943.  She was renamed Zwaardvisch, Dutch for "Swordfish".  She went on to lead a distinguished career.

Under the command of Lieutenant Hendrikus Goossens, Zwaardvisch moved to Rothesay the following month and began sea trials based out of Holy Loch until February 1944. Throughout late February and into March, the submarine undertook patrols into the Atlantic and then off the coast of Norway. Later, she attempted to find the  before returning to Dundee. A patrol to the Portuguese coast followed in May, after which she put into Gibraltar, where orders transferring the vessel to the Far East were received. Arriving in Trincomalee, Ceylon, in July 1944, Zwaardvisch came under the operational control of the British Far East Fleet, and conducted a patrol through the Strait of Malacca, during which time she attacked several ships, including Kim Hup Soen and two Malaysian sailing vessels, mainly with her deck gun.

Assigned to the British 8th Submarine Flotilla, Zwaardvisch operated out of Fremantle, Western Australia, after September 1944, at which time she was placed under the operational command of the US fleet. On 6 October 1944, she sank the German submarine  with a spread of six torpedoes, hitting the U-168 twice, one torpedo detonating in the U-168's forward torpedo room. The submarine had been on a patrol around Java when she received directions via radio to establish an ambush off Surabaya, where she subsequently torpedoed and sank U-168, which had been on its way to Japan to transfer important military technologies.

The final months of the war were spent in the South China Sea attacking Japanese merchantmen, and patrolling the Lombok Strait. In February 1945, Zwaardvisch was attacked and damaged by a Japanese aircraft and had to return to Fremantle the following month for repairs. Once these were complete, she returned to the Java Sea under the command of Lieutenant Jan van Dapperen, where she made further attacks on Japanese merchantmen throughout April and May before returning to Fremantle to repair faulty communications and weapons systems. Following the surrender of Germany in early May, the submarine returned to Britain to undertake further repairs in Dundee before transferring to Rotterdam in August 1945.

Apart from a voyage to the Dutch West Indies in 1947, she had a relatively quiet postwar career, being renamed Zwaardvis in 1950. She was decommissioned on 11 December 1962, and was sold to be broken up for scrap on 12 July 1963.

References

Citations

Bibliography
 
 
 

 

Ships built in Barrow-in-Furness
1943 ships
World War II submarines of the United Kingdom
Zwaardvisch-class submarines
World War II submarines of the Netherlands